Mark Edwardson (born 1967) is a former TV news presenter and reporter for BBC North West Tonight based at MediaCity UK in Salford. He is also a seasoned radio presenter having hosted the breakfast shows at BBC Radio Stoke and BBC GMR.

Early life
Mark Edwardson was born on 3 March 1967 at Cowley Hill Hospital in St Helens, Lancashire and grew up in Haydock. He has one sister. Edwardson was educated at English Martyrs RC Primary School in Haydock, St Edmund Arrowsmith Catholic High School, Ashton in Makerfield and St John Rigby College, Orrell. He graduated from Edge Hill College, Ormskirk with an Honours Degree.

Career
Edwardson first worked as a rent collector for the local council in his hometown of St. Helens. After 18 months in the job, he got his first job in broadcasting by asking a radio station news editor if he needed help on a busy derby day in Manchester. He survived the Hillsborough Disaster in Sheffield in April 1989, and presented an emotional special report on North West Tonight on the day of the 20th anniversary of the disaster in 2009. On 1 January 2021 he announced while presenting an evening news bulletin, that it was his final appearance for BBC North West Tonight.

In an interview with the Congleton Chronicle in January 2023, Edwardson announced his plans to stand as an independent candidate for Congleton Town Council and Cheshire East Council at the 2023 United Kingdom Local Elections.

In late January 2023 Edwardson and two other independent candidates standing in the 2023 United kingdom Local Elections in Congleton formed the Congleton Independents political party. The party was formed due to a "plot to destroy" the chances of independent candidates in Congleton winning at the local elections.

References

Living people
People from St Helens, Merseyside
Alumni of Edge Hill University
1967 births
People from Haydock
BBC North West newsreaders and journalists